Garbiñe Muguruza and Carla Suárez Navarro were the defending champions, but chose not to participate this year.
 
Xu Yifan and Zheng Saisai won the title, defeating Anabel Medina Garrigues and Arantxa Parra Santonja in the final, 6–1, 6–3.

Seeds

Draw

Draw

External links
 Main draw

Bank of the West Classic - Doubles
2015 Doubles